Rocío Ybarra Solaun (born 26 December 1984) is a field hockey defender from Spain, who represented her native country at the 2004 Olympic Games in Athens, the 2008 Games in Beijing and the 2016 Games in Rio de Janeiro, where she was captain (Spain did not qualify in 2012).

She played internationally with the Spain national team that finished fourth at the 2006 Women's Hockey World Cup in Madrid under the guidance of coach Pablo Usoz.

Her family has played hockey at a high level for three generations; her twin sister Lucía was also selected for Spain while her great-uncle Julio Solaun (known as Javier) competed at the 1964 and 1968 Olympic Games.

References

External links
 
 Spanish Olympic Committee

1984 births
Living people
Spanish female field hockey players
Olympic field hockey players of Spain
Field hockey players at the 2004 Summer Olympics
Field hockey players at the 2008 Summer Olympics
Field hockey players at the 2016 Summer Olympics
Sportspeople from Bilbao
Field hockey players from the Basque Country (autonomous community)
Female field hockey defenders
Spanish twins
Twin sportspeople